Tokke is a river in Vestfold og Telemark county, Norway. The Tokke river system was regulated for hydroelectric power generation between 1959 and 1979.

See also
List of rivers in Norway

References

Vinje
Rivers of Vestfold og Telemark